Tetraopes sublaevis is a species of beetle in the family Cerambycidae. It was described by Thomas Lincoln Casey, Jr. in 1913. It is known from the United States.

References

Tetraopini
Beetles described in 1913
Taxa named by Thomas Lincoln Casey Jr.